Krunk may refer to:

 Krunk (society), a cultural-charitable society in Abkhazia, 1990–2004
 Krunk or Crunk, a subgenre of hip hop music
 KrunK, renamed Kottak, an American punk rock/pop punk group
 Krúnk, the record label run by Icelandic band Sigur Rós
 Atlanta Krunk Wolverines or Charlotte Krunk, renamed Augusta Groove, an American basketball team 
 Krunk UAV, an Armenian unmanned aerial vehicle

Arts, media, and entertainment
 Krunk (Crash Bandicoot), a character in the video game series
 Krunk (Transformers), a character in The Transformers: Headmasters, a Marvel comics mini-series
 Krunk (profanity), a fictional expletive on American television series Late Night with Conan O'Brien
 The Infraggable Krunk, a purple superhero in The Justice Friends segment of the animated television series Dexter's Laboratory
 Krunk, a character in the television series Tim and Eric Awesome Show, Great Job!

See also
 Crunk (disambiguation)
 Kronk (disambiguation)